Typhoon Rai, known in the Philippines as Super Typhoon Odette, was the second costliest typhoon in Philippine history behind Typhoon Haiyan in 2013. Rai was a powerful rare tropical cyclone that struck the Philippines in December 2021. Rai became the first Category 5-equivalent super typhoon to develop in the month of December since Nock-ten in 2016, and the third Category 5 super typhoon recorded in the South China Sea, following Pamela in 1954 and Rammasun in 2014. The 22nd tropical storm, the ninth typhoon, and the fifth super typhoon of the 2021 Pacific typhoon season, the system originated from a tropical disturbance near the equator on December 10, forming near the site of another low-pressure area that had dissipated on the previous day. Conditions around the system were favorable for further development, and it slowly developed into a tropical depression on December 12. On the same day, the United States Joint Typhoon Warning Center (JTWC) issued a Tropical Cyclone Formation Alert (TCFA) on the consolidating depression. Further intensification ensued, and Rai was upgraded to a tropical storm the next day, before passing south of Ngulu Atoll. After passing near Palau and impacting the island nation, Rai entered the Philippine Area of Responsibility (PAR) by the night of December 14, where the Philippine Atmospheric, Geophysical and Astronomical Services Administration (PAGASA) named it "Odette". On the next day, both the JMA and JTWC raised the system's intensity to a low-end Category 1-equivalent typhoon, as an eye continued to appear. While approaching the Philippines, Rai unexpectedly rapidly intensified into a Category 5 super typhoon just before its first landfall across Siargao. It then slowly but steadily weakened as it traversed the Visayas, exiting into the Sulu Sea. After making its last landfall over Palawan, Rai continued to weaken before unexpectedly re-intensifying into a Category 5-equivalent typhoon by December 18, while nearing Vietnam. On the next day, Rai entered yet another weakening phase, dissipating on December 22, southeast of Hong Kong.

As Rai pounded the Philippines, heavy rainfall and strong and gusty winds impacted several areas around the storm's path. Many areas across the Visayas and Mindanao lost electricity with several provinces and areas being deprived further of communication services. Downed trees obstructed many roadways, and flooding was a major problem across the affected regions, particularly Bohol, where the storm was described as "one of the worst for the province". Rivers also overflowed across Cagayan de Oro, while numerous buildings sustained damage. Surigao City was reported to be completely damaged, and appealed for aid. Bohol also pleaded for help from the government due to the damages Rai brought to the area. A state of calamity has been placed in the province and Cebu. So far, 410 people have died, a large portion of which were from the severely affected island of Bohol. Damages at the aforementioned location were projected to be worth ₱5 billion ($100 million), with those in Siargao being estimated to be worth ₱20 billion ($401 million) and those in Negros Occidental being estimated to be worth ₱5.9 billion ($118 million).

Meteorological history 

A broad circulation was identified by the agency, with flaring convection over it. The circulation had a marginal environment with low to moderate wind shear, fair outflow, and warm sea surface temperatures. Despite its given environment, however, the disturbance failed to intensify and dissipated by 06:00 UTC the next day. Another new area of low pressure formed on December 10, near the location of the previous disturbance. Analysis on the system revealed a degraded and disorganized low-level circulation center. Position fixes by 02:30 UTC on December 11 determined that its center had shifted to the north over a developing surface trough, while convective bursts occurred around the system. An ASCAT pass featured below gale-force winds on its northwest quadrant.

By 03:00 UTC on December 13, the JTWC upgraded the system to a weak tropical depression, highly based on Dvorak ratings of T1.5. Nine hours later, the JMA classified the system as a tropical storm based on Dvorak ratings and named the storm Rai. It was not until 15:00 UTC that day when the JTWC upgraded Rai to a tropical storm, as it began tracking northwestward. Three hours later, Rai began to pass south of Ngulu State, while continuing to intensify and organize. By December 14 in the early morning, the system was upgraded to a severe tropical storm by the JMA. By 09:00 UTC, the JTWC noted that the system's cloud tops became warm; however, it further organized while tracking towards the small island country of Palau. The storm entered the Philippine Area of Responsibility around 11:00 UTC (19:00 PHT), and was named Odette by the PAGASA. Four hours later, Rai began to exhibit an eye which was first seen on microwave images. The JMA further upgraded the system to a typhoon by the next day, followed by the JTWC three hours later as Rai began to take a westward motion under the influence of a subtropical ridge to its north. Steady intensification occurred on Rai while moving near the country, reaching high-end Category 1-equivalent typhoon intensity by 15:00 UTC. At this time, the JTWC only forecasted a landfall equivalent to a Category 2 storm.

At this time, a small  eye was seen along with strong convection. The storm began an eyewall replacement cycle (ERC) shortly after reaching peak intensity. On December 16, the typhoon made landfall over Siargao Island in the province of Surigao del Norte around 1:30 PM local time (05:30 UTC) and a second landfall over Dinagat Islands around 3:10 PM local time (07:10 UTC). A third landfall occurred in Liloan, Southern Leyte at 3:40 PM local time (7:40 UTC). A fourth landfall occurred at Panaon Island, also at Liloan, at around 4:50 PM (8:50 UTC). Padre Burgos, Southern Leyte was the fifth at 5:40 PM (09:40 UTC), followed nearly one-hour later at President Carlos P. Garcia, Bohol and approximately another hour at Bien Unido, still at Bohol. The eighth landfall occurred at Carcar, Cebu by 10:00 PM (14:00 UTC) and the ninth over La Libertad, Negros Oriental, two hours later. The same situation slightly weakened the system into a Category 4-equivalent super typhoon by 09:00 UTC, and its intensity continued to degrade, six hours later while crossing Visayas. As Rai entered the Panay Gulf, its eye further weakened and its convective signature becoming disorganized as the JTWC further downgraded it to a Category 3 system six hours later. It continued to weaken while tracking towards the Sulu Sea by the next day at 03:00 UTC. A new eye also struggled to form as the system was nearing landfall.
By 07:10 UTC (15:10 PHT), the system made another and last landfall over Roxas, Palawan as it continued to lose intensity. It then entered the South China Sea with more organization but its intensity remaining the same. Rai then started to slightly strengthen as it turned northwestward, away from the Philippine archipelago. The system then left the PAR by 12:40 PHT (04:40 UTC). For the first time since Typhoon Rammasun in 2014 and the third after Pamela of 1954 and the aforementioned storm, Rai unexpectedly attained Category 5-equivalent super typhoon status in the South China Sea, due to the favorable environment in that region, at 21:00 UTC on December 18, as it underwent a secondary period of rapid intensification.

By 03:00 UTC the next day, Rai again weakened below Category 5-equivalent super typhoon intensity, while turning in a west-northwesterly direction. Its eye was cloud-filled by this time, with the storm rapidly weakening afterward. The storm was still rapidly weakening as of 12:00 UTC on December 20, being forecasted to dissipate off the coast of Guangdong, China. As forecasted, Rai dissipated two days later off the coast of Guangdong Province, China.

On March 23, 2022, as PAGASA issued their revised tropical cyclone scale, Rai (Odette) was considered as a super typhoon.

Preparations

Federated States of Micronesia 
Upon the system's intensification into a tropical depression, a typhoon watch was issued by the US National Weather Service in Tiyan, Guam, in Koror and Kayangel while a tropical storm warning was placed for Ngulu Atoll. The island of Yap was placed also under tropical storm watch. This was further upgraded into a typhoon warning for Palau as Rai further intensifies. The alerts for Ngulu and Yap were first canceled by 09:00 UTC of December 14 and six hours later, the typhoon warning were also canceled for Palau.

Philippines 

PAGASA began issuing Tropical Cyclone Advisories as early as December 12 given the forecasted track of the storm. In its first advisory, PAGASA forecasted the possibility of Signal #4 being raised over the Visayas and Mindanao regions, later lowered to Signal #3. The PAGASA also forecasted winds of up to  prior to landfall. On December 14, storm signals were raised in Caraga and Eastern Visayas as the storm entered the Philippine Area of Responsibility. Starting on the night of December 13, land travel on bound to Visayas, Mindanao, the province of Masbate and Catanduanes were canceled according to an approved request of the Office of the Civil Defense in the country. The Land Transportation Office also placed the same travel restrictions in Mindanao and Luzon as a precaution. All types of vessels are also prohibited to leave the country's ports if there are any storm signals raised. Fishermen living near coastal areas were also urged by the country's coast guard to leave their homes "as soon as possible". Other Philippine provinces like Bohol and Aklan were also prepared for possible work cancelations and evacuation premises in regards to the storm. Floating cottages in General Santos, as well as fishing boats were brought to shore and safety. The vaccination operations across the possible affected areas were earlier suspended by December 20–22. Over 23,642 food packs for evacuees were also readied by the country's Department of Social Welfare and Development (DSWD), over 18,665 non-edible items as well as over ₱752,250 (US$14,950) worth of standby funds. The airline carrier Cebu Pacific also suspended three flights in the country.

Over 10,000 individuals in barangays across Mindanao, Visayas, and further north into Southern Luzon were also urged by the National Disaster Risk Reduction and Management Council (NDRRMC) to immediately leave their homes. The whole of Bicol Region was also under red alert starting on December 14. The higher authorities there also warned its people of possible landslides and lahar flow from the Mayon Volcano. Cebu was also under a "state of preparedness" due to the storm. Furthermore, many individuals, of which the majority are going into the Bicol Region in the Parañaque Integrated Terminal Exchange (PITX) were also stranded due to ferry suspensions. Capiz already started voluntary evacuations at this time, first focused on people living in coastal areas. Liloan, Cebu also initiated forced evacuations by the afternoon of December 15. Several flights into Visayas and Mindanao from Ninoy Aquino International Airport were also delayed, rescheduled, and/or canceled, mainly from the earlier Cebu Pacific, Philippine Airlines and Airasia. Some face-to-face classes in the affected areas were also halted. Many billboards in Bohol were also removed and the annual Binirayan festival in Antique was canceled due to Rai. The city of Surigao was already soaked by the rains of Odette by the afternoon of December 15, including the whole of Eastern Visayas. Thousands of evacuees rushed into safety shelters in the area whereas in one case, they became full. Sandbags were also placed over some houses in Tacloban City in Leyte and many individuals rushed into a grocery store in Alangalang to stock up on essential supplies.

Four hours after, Rai entered the PAR, PAGASA started to hoist Tropical Cyclone Warning Signal #1 for southeastern Eastern Samar and over the Surigao provinces, including the Dinagat Islands. This was further extended into some provinces in the Central Visayas and further south of Mindanao, until Agusan del Sur. Signal #2 were further placed for the Surigao provinces and further into some parts of Visayas as Odette further intensified into a typhoon, with Signal #1 spreading further into the remaining part of the region and Mimaropa and Southern Tagalog provinces. The storm's further intensification led to PAGASA raising the Signal #3 warning in some portions of Caraga and as Rai underwent rapid intensification, into eastern Visayas before Signal #4 was raised in those areas.

On December 15, militants of the New People's Army attacked troops evacuating residents in Surigao del Sur prior to the storm, killing three civilians. On December 16, the PAGASA raised the signal in western Bohol, Dinagat Islands, and Surigao to Signal #5. 9,720 thousand were evacuated as Typhoon Rai made landfall. Following Rai's impact, around 332,000 people have been evacuated from their homes in total as of December 17.

Highest Tropical Cyclone Wind Signal

Vietnam 
As Rai approached Vietnam after clearing the Philippines, officials held a meeting in which more than 243,254 houses across eight Vietnamese provinces were identified as "unsafe", while rice crops were harvested by farmers in preparation for the storm. Vietnam Airlines' flight operations were also halted due to the typhoon, while marine equipment, particularly fishing boats, were moved onto shores as a precautionary measure. Lý Sơn Island also prepared to evacuate over 7,800 individuals. Towing vessels were also readied in case of marine emergencies over the South China Sea. Medicine and food packs were also prepared while houses over the areas that are foreseen to be affected by Rai were secured. 305,000 individuals were also readied to be evacuated from Quảng Bình to Bình Thuận. Heavy rainfall, strong winds and rough waves were also forecasted.

Macau and Hong Kong 
In Macau, the Macao Meteorological and Geophysical Bureau (SMG) hoisted the typhoon warning signal number one in the early hours at 1AM on 20 December 2021 (MST). In Hong Kong, the Hong Kong Observatory issued the number 1 tropical cyclone signal at 11:20AM (HKT) on 20 December 2021, as Typhoon Rai approached the territory. Rai is the first typhoon on record to neccistate the issuance of typhoon warning signal in the territory in mid-December, on 20 December 2021, and the second on record in December. The last time such a signal warning was issued in Hong Kong in December was in 1974 as a response to Typhoon Irma. and was cancelled at 12:20PM HKT the following day.

Elsewhere 
In China, Blue Typhoon warnings were issued in Hainan and Guangdong Provinces by the China Meteorological Administration.

Impact

Philippines

Rai caused severe and widespread damage throughout the Southern Philippines, killing at least 409. As of February 7, 2022, the NDRRMC has reported ₱29.3 billion (US$571 million) of infrastructure damages, along with ₱22.3 billion (US$435 million) of agricultural damage and ₱63 million (US$1.2 million) worth of damages to houses, with a combined total of ₱51.8 billion (US$1.02 billion).

Over 100,000 people were moved to higher ground as flooding occurred. Strong winds and heavy rainfall also impacted Guiuan, Eastern Samar, with rough waves bashing the shores of the province, according to a news correspondent of 24 Oras. The same situation was also felt across the entirety of Western Visayas. As Rai impacted Liloan in Southern Leyte, an area there was described as "cut-off", indicating that there was no electricity or means of communications in the place. A GMA News reporter recalling his experience inside the storm reported that the building where his team was sustained considerable damage, comparing it to Typhoon Haiyan in terms of ferocity. Their vehicles also received damage from the storm. After the storm passed over the area, the whole municipality was reported to be isolated. Many provinces in Mindanao also were severely affected by the typhoon. In Cagayan de Oro, despite rushing water, rescue teams continued to save many people in their houses from the floods. A house was heavily destroyed by Odette's strong winds in Agusan del Norte while a barge of unknown origins was left stranded by the storm's waves on a shore, still in the province. Storm surge also impacted the coast boulevards of Surigao del Norte while Iligan's Mandulog River overflowed. The incident was a horror to many residents there, due to the same effect Tropical Storm Washi in 2011 brought. Further south, it also caused rough waves over Cateel. The Cagayan de Oro River also overflowed, causing several homes to be near-completely inundated. The first fatality from the storm was reported at Iloilo, where a woman was crushed to death in her house by a bamboo tree.

Surigao City was deprived of electricity and communications due to downed power lines while scores of trees left many roads impassable. Many buildings in the area were also devastated and the overall impact of Rai in the area were described as "widespread". Clean water supply became a problem in the city while almost all coastal houses were destroyed by the typhoon's storm surge. The main wet market of the area was also closed, still due to the effects of the system. Authorities are verifying a possible second death due to Rai in the city and a third elsewhere in southern Mindanao. The mayor of Surigao City, Ernesto Matugas also estimated that 100% of the area was devastated due to Odette, also appealing for aid to the government. Aid was also requested by the province of Bohol, where a chief of the area's Provincial Disaster Risk Reduction and Management Office (PDRRMO) described Rai as the "one of the worst ever for the province". Many areas in the island were severely inundated, including Loboc, among the worst hit. The whole province also lost power services. The governor of the province, Arthur Yap estimated the damages at ₱5 billion. A terminal in Siargao Airport was also totally destroyed; the overall island was also wrecked according to the first district representative of Surigao del Norte, Francisco Jose Matugas II. Southern Surigao confirmed a death, while two people died in Bukidnon. Three individuals were killed due to various reasons across Negros Occidental. Numerous houses there were also destroyed by downed trees, with a triage of the Ignacio Locsin Arroyo Memorial District Hospital being wrecked. Some areas in Kabankalan were also inundated due to a river overflowing there. The Philippine National Police (PNP) also listed two people to be unaccounted for from Western Visayas.

Further assessments of the NDRRMC reported at least 12 killed due to the typhoon across the affected areas, while seven people were missing. A briefing with the Philippine President Rodrigo Duterte occurred on the night of December 17, where the agency noted that many provinces were also pleading for help, especially Cebu. The governor of Surigao also observed that over 99 percent of individuals of Surigao were affected. Aerial operations were also conducted by the Philippine Coast Guard, where they saw the total devastation of the island. The area were also reported to have been isolated from any means of transportations except for air. The government there also estimated damages to be . The Dinagat Islands were also wrecked due to Rai, with their governor Arlene Bag-ao also requesting aid from the government, and saying the islands was "levelled to the ground". 95 percent of houses were estimated to have lost their roofs, and emergency shelters were destroyed. Almost all of Visayas have been left without electricity, according to the Department of Energy (DOE).

At least 332,000 people were evacuated from their homes. The storm affected areas that were still rebuilding from storms late last year. At least 140,000 people were severely affected, with the United Nations estimating 13 million were affected in some way. Military-released aerial photos showed General Luna was destroyed by the typhoon. As the ravaged areas were examined, the death toll rose to 75, the majority of which were from Bohol. 12 were further reported by December 19, making the casualty toll at 87 as of that day. A landslide also caused the deaths of five people and left six missing, out of 11, further raising the toll to 92. The Associated Press, however indicated that over 112 were killed during the storm. 78 marine vessels in Cebu also experienced sea mishaps, according to the PCG, while over 4,000 houses in Southern Leyte were destroyed due to the storm-induced storm surge. In northern Palawan, where Rai made its last landfall before clearing the country, many houses were downed and trees obstructed several roadways. Many locations in the province, including the major city Puerto Princesa were left without electricity, water supply and communication signals. 630,000 people were displaced, 438,000 were in 2,841 evacuation centers. At least 41 areas were flooded, 227 municipalities experienced power outages, and 135 saw telecommunication issues. Three days after the storm, 9% were estimated to have their outages fixed, and 70% communication restored. 139,000 houses were damaged, with 54,000 being totally damaged and 82,000 partially.

On Pag-asa Island of the Spratly Islands, some residential houses, schools, and government facilities including the new coast guard station were severely damaged by the typhoon.

Vietnam
Rai wreaked havoc across Vietnamese-held isles in the Spratly Islands. The storm destroyed  of civilian house tiles, 27 solar batteries,  of farmland, and knocked down 90% of the trees on the island; no casualties were reported there. Rai began to batter the Central Vietnamese coast at night, with winds in several provinces averaging . In Nghệ An province, two crew members of a fishing vessel were reported missing in the waters off Bạch Long Vĩ Island.

On December 19, one person (fisherman) was reported dead in Tuy Phong, five ships were capsized and three others were damaged off the coast of Bình Thuận. Rough storm waves damaged and destroyed 90 lobster herds on Bình Hưng Island, Cam Ranh, where losses is estimated to be more than 200 billion VND ($8.72 million).

Aftermath

Philippines 
Social media coverage of the typhoon was much less than expected the day after Rai. Possible effects from the newly emerged COVID-19 Omicron variant were feared to be worsened by the typhoon's effects. The DSWD further elaborated that over ₱900 million ($18 million) worth of standby funds were already prepared for the people affected by Odette. Food and water was sparse for those impacted by the storm. The storage of COVID-19 vaccines and vaccine kits were also feared to be disrupted due to power outages. While there were reports of vaccine wastage due to the typhoon, the Department of Health assured that the impact of the typhoon was minimal. Immediately after the storm, presidential aspirants for the 2022 elections set up relief and recovery operations for the victims of the storm, particularly in Samar and Leyte provinces. Major telecommunication networks in the country reported communication disruptions in Visayas and Mindanao but assured that their respective teams are trying to restore services. Other local government units sent aid to the areas severely affected by the typhoon.

On December 17, the provinces of Cebu and Bohol were placed into a state of calamity due to widespread damages. Philippine president Rodrigo Duterte announced that he will tour Leyte, Surigao, Bohol and Cebu to check the situation there. Recovery funds up to ₱2 billion ($40 million) were promised by the national government for the affected areas of the storm. Duterte started to tour Surigao City, Siargao, Maasin, and Dinagat Islands on December 18. Aid teams were not able to enter into certain affected areas due to waterlogging, debris, and other obstacles. Thousands of emergency personnel were deployed. 2 people died of dehydration after Rai passed. Catholic Bishops in the country declared Christmas Day and December 26 as national days of prayer and mourning for Rai's victims. The government's promise for 35,000 food packs took longer than expected to arrive, and was found to not be enough for people affected. Days later in Bohol, power outages still ranged in the millions. The provinces governor, Arthur Yap, feared the situation could worsen due to a lack of a contingency fund, with supplies of necessities running dry. Looting as a potential problem also rose among affected populations.

Lack of media coverage capacity 
News coverage regarding the impacts of Rai was limited in the days after the typhoon struck, a fact partly attributed to the shutdown of the regional news stations of media network ABS-CBN, which had earlier been denied a renewal of its congressional franchise. With internet service knocked out and mobile phone networks brought down in the wake of the typhoon, news from the typhoon-hit areas was very limited in the critical first days after the disaster.

International response 
After Rai hit the Philippines, the governments of Canada, China, the United Kingdom, European Union, South Korea, Singapore, Japan and the United Nations had so far announced their intention to assist the country.

 : Provided 20,000 food rations to affected areas, 19 trucks for relief operations, and logistics assistance. 
 : Sent 20,000 food packs worth  and 4.725 million kilograms of rice to typhoon-stricken areas in the country.
 : Provided an initial €1.7 million (₱96 million) for the victims of Typhoon Rai.
: Provided $2,000,000 in immediate funds to support people affected.
: Provided US$50,000 via the Singapore Red Cross Society, with the Singaporean government contributing another US$60,000 (which also went towards relief efforts on the floods in Malaysia).
: Provided emergency assistance packs consisting of generators, sleeping mattresses and pads, and dome tents via the Japan International Cooperation Agency.
: Provided core relief products including solar lamps, hygiene kits and mosquito nets to the severely impacted islands via the United Nations High Commissioner for Refugees.

Apple CEO Tim Cook has pledged to commit itself to rebuilding communities in both Malaysia and the Philippines while also providing short term relief and recovery efforts.

Retirement
Due to the extensive damage brought by the typhoon in the Philippines, the PAGASA announced that Odette will be stricken from the rotating list of typhoon names, and will no longer be used in the future. On March 21, 2022, the PAGASA chose the name Opong as its replacement for the 2025 season.

Notes

See also  

Weather of 2021
Tropical cyclones in 2021
List of super typhoons
Typhoon Louise–Marge (Ining–Liling, 1964) – took a similar path and also attained Category 5 intensity at a low latitude like Rai
Typhoon Nelson (Bising, 1982) – another destructive typhoon that took a similar path
Typhoon Ike (Nitang, 1984) – deadliest typhoon to hit the Caraga region
Typhoon Mike (Ruping, 1990) – another Category 5-equivalent typhoon that took an identical track in November 1990
Typhoon Bopha (Pablo, 2012) – strongest typhoon to hit Mindanao which took a similar path and attained Category 5 intensity at a low latitude like Rai
Typhoon Haiyan (Yolanda, 2013) – deadliest typhoon to strike the Philippines in modern history and affected the same areas as Rai
Tropical Storm Megi (Agaton, 2022) – a weak but deadly tropical storm that impacted the same areas 4 months later

References

External links 

JMA General Information of Typhoon Rai (2122) from Digital Typhoon
JMA Best Track Data (Graphics) of Typhoon Rai (2122)
JMA Best Track Data  (PDF) of Typhoon Rai (2122) (in Japanese)
JTWC Best Track Data of Super Typhoon 28W (Rai)
28W.RAI from the U.S. Naval Research Laboratory

2021 disasters in the Philippines
2021 disasters in Vietnam
2021 meteorology
2021 Pacific typhoon season
December 2021 events in Asia
Tropical cyclones in 2021
Retired Philippine typhoon names
Typhoons
Typhoons in the Federated States of Micronesia
Typhoons in the Philippines
2021 in Vietnam
Typhoons in Vietnam
Typhoons in Guam